Lavrenti Dyadyunovich Son (born February 2, 1941) is a Koryo-saram playwright, author of short stories, and founder of Song Cinema, a documentary company producing movies about the minority ethnicities of the former USSR. His play Memory (기억), about the deportation of Koreans in the Soviet Union, is one of the few plays to ever be written in Koryo-mar. It was first performed by the Korean Theatre of Kazakhstan in 1997.

References

External links 
 

1941 births
Kazakhstani dramatists and playwrights
Kazakhstani people of Korean descent
Koryo-saram
Living people
Soviet people of Korean descent